Down Home is an album by the American blues musician Z. Z. Hill, released in 1982. "Down Home Blues", the album's first track, was a crossover hit, and is regarded as a blues standard. The song is said to be the best selling blues single of the 20th century.

The album peaked at No. 209 on the Billboard 200. It has sold more than 500,000 copies; for a time, it was Malaco Records' biggest seller.

Production
Down Home was produced by Tommy Couch and Wolf Stephenson, and was recorded in Jackson, Mississippi. "Down Home Blues" was written by George Jackson.

Critical reception

Living Blues wrote: "With all due respect to Robert Cray's greater success on the pop charts, Z. Z. Hill's 'Down Home Blues' is the most influential single blues recording of the '80s, and perhaps is the modern day blues anthem."

MusicHound R&B: The Essential Album Guide called Down Home "maybe the realization of [Hill's] life's work." AllMusic deemed it "one of the very few classic blues albums of the 1980s."

Track listing

References

1982 albums
Blues albums by American artists